Mesosa stictica is a species of beetle in the family Cerambycidae. It was described by Blanchard in 1871. It is known from China.

Subspecies
 Mesosa stictica rugosa Gressitt, 1953
 Mesosa stictica stictica Blanchard, 1871

References

stictica
Beetles described in 1871